The 1978–79 NBA season was Indiana's third season in the NBA and 12th season as a franchise.

Offseason

Draft picks

This table only lists picks through the second round.

Roster

Regular season

Season standings

z - clinched division title
y - clinched division title
x - clinched playoff spot

Record vs. opponents

Awards and records
 Don Buse, NBA All-Defensive First Team

References

Indiana Pacers seasons
Indiana
Indiana Pacers
Indiana Pacers